Lithuanian coup can refer to:

 1919 Polish coup d'état attempt in Lithuania
 1926 Lithuanian coup d'état
 Coup of the Volunteers of 1993